This is a list of episodes from the series Scruff.

Pilot Episode
 Wanted A Home 
 What Will We Do With This Dog 
 The Course of Three Dogs 
 Craving for Eggs 
 Christmas is Almost Here 
 Preying Around 
 A Circus Dog 
 The Circus Star 
 Fox Hunting 
 Bringing the Flock Home 
 A Canned Tail 
 The Runaway 
 Shackled by Fear 
 Staking Out Territory 
 Two Families For Just One Dog 
 The Hero Of Nevell 
 Scruff And Peter Ltd 
 That's Not For Playing With 
 Smells Like An Adventure 
 Princess Always On His Mind 
 Fugitives 
 Prizes Galore 
 All Because Of A Mushrooms Omlett 
 Going Up The Rock 
 Where's Miaow 
 It's Time To Say Good-Bye

Season 1 (2000)-(2001)
 Useless and Unnessary 
 Too Much Sun 
 The Last Of His Kind 
 A Testing Time 
Uncle Ron and Aunt lil 
Peter the city mechanic 
Early Retirement 
Friends Face off 
Princess is not Impressed 
Invisible scruff 
A Foxy Tale
Changing places 
America 
Books and Roses
Sweet and sour dreams 
Kidnapping of The chestnuts seller 
Some Very Generous Truits 
Run Aways 
Totally barking
I'm not me
Be yourself
Best friends
The richest Treasure 
Spring Has sprung 
Neither mine nors yours 
A Saint's Day For Scruff 
Where are you scruff 
Fire 
Sing What you like 
April Fool 
Honey Tongued
Moonstruck 
The Floral Games of Navell 
Saint Anthony's Day 
The Devils 
The Tree Festival 
Good luck Bad luck
The Godfather 
The First cherry
Fireside Stories

Season 2 (2002)-(2003)
Scruff, I'll Never Leave You 
The Messenger Dog 
The Rain Man 
A Puppy Forever 
Can't Cope
The Monument 
Things Aren't Always What They Seem 
The Law of Nature 
Contradictius Muscarius 
I'm Not Always Happy All the Time
Peter is Jealous 
Count Scruffala 
Buttons and Circus, Owners of Tolosa Farm 
The Tramps 
Theory of Practice 
Buttons, My Love 
The Joking Dog 
ST, the Extraterrestrial Dog 
The Dog Who Knew too Much 
The Other Scruff 
Dogs and Masters 
The Date 
A New Home For Strummer 
Peter, a Free Man 
A Bad Day 
Family Ghosts 
Insurance For Dogs
No to War 
The Peter Show 
The Road 
Privacy 
The Family Feud
Eclipsed 
The Crazy Firecracker 
The Case of the Hens That Laid Fried Eggs
Strummer Without His Guitar
If They Could Talk 
Mutiny in the Series 
Where is Everybody

Scruff 6 Movies (2005)-(2006)-(2007)
Scruff and the legend of saint George
Scruff in a midsummer nights dream
Scruff Cinderella's carnival
Scruff's Halloween
Scruff A Christmas tale
Scruff Christmas without clause

Notes
 The show often re-used footage (example, the rain storm scene from "The Course of Three Dogs" was used 3 more times.
 "A Circus Dog", and "The Circus Star" was a 2-part episode.

Scruff episodes lists of